Timothy Lawrence Cutler (born 23 March 1982), is an Australian born Hong Kong cricket player and administrator. He is a right-hand bat as well as slow left-arm orthodox who had played cricket for the Hong Kong Cricket Club in the Hong Kong domestic cricket competitions. He is the founder of Emerging Cricket which he established in late 2018.

Career 
Cutler initially pursued his career in marine insurance straightaway after finishing his high school education. He moved to Hong Kong in 2013 after spending a brief period of time in marine insurance in Brisbane.

Cutler was named as the first CEO of Hong Kong Cricket Association in 2014 but it took a long process before being appointed to the position in May 2015, tasked with making Hong Kong cricket a shining light among the associates and building bridges with the government as well as the International Cricket Council. He served as CEO of Hong Kong Cricket Association from 2015 to 2017 and during his tenure Hong Kong T20 Blitz was launched. He resigned from the position of Hong Cricket CEO in April 2017.

In late 2018, Cutler formed a WhatsApp group chat with Daniel Beswick and Nick Skinner regarding to develop the sport of cricket to other parts of the world and launched the Emerging Cricket platform.

In March 2021, he was appointed as the CEO of Vanuatu Cricket Association replacing Shane Deitz and he is expected to commence his term as CEO from mid-April 2021.

References

External links

1982 births
Living people
Australian expatriate sportspeople in Hong Kong
Cricketers from Sydney
Hong Kong cricket administrators